Desaires (English: Slights) is the title of a studio album released by Spanish performer Rocío Dúrcal on 16 November 1993 under the label of BMG Ariola. Written and produced by Mexican songwriter Joan Sebastian. This album peaked at number-sixteen on the U.S. Billboard Latin Pop Albums.

Four singles were released from "Desaires". The album's lead single "Desaires" peaked at number 4 on the U.S. Billboard Hot Latin Tracks. The second single "Mi Credo" peaked at number 16 on the chart Hot Latin Tracks.

Track listing

Charts 
 Billboard Singles

 Billboard Albums

Certifications 
 Certifications

Credits and personnel 
Musicians
 Rocío Dúrcal – (Vocals)
 Joan Sebastian – (Words and Music).
 Rigoberto Alfaro – (Guitar and Background vocals).
 Jose Guadalupe Alfaro – (Vihuela).
 Bernardino De Santiago – (Guitarron).
 Cesar Gomez – (Flute).
 Javier Carrillo – (Harmonica, Strings).
 Francisco Javier Serrano – (Trumpet and Cornet).
 Antonio Morales, Jose Manuel Figueroa – (Background, Vocals).
 Mariachi Aguilas De America De Javier Carrillo – (Strings, Choir).

Production
 Direction and Production: Joan Sebastian.
 Words and music all topics: Joan Sebastian.
 Engineers: Rob Russell.
 Assistant Engineer: Brian Young.
 Makeup: Alan Simancas.
 Recorded at: Record Milagro, Los Angeles, California and Ocean Way Recording Studios, Hollywood, California.
 Label: BMG Music, Ariola Records (CD) and (LP), RCA Records (Cassette).
 Manufactured and Distributed by: Ariola International.

References 

1993 albums
Rocío Dúrcal albums